Damiano may refer to:

Damiano (surname)
Damiano (given name)
Damiano, Pella, village in Pella regional unit, Greece.
Damiano Defence, a series of chess opening moves

See also
San Damiano (disambiguation)